Ambrose Browne (11 January 1659 - July 1688) was an English politician who sat in the House of Commons from 1685 to 1688.

Browne was the son of Sir Adam Browne, 2nd Baronet of  Betchworth Castle, Surrey and his wife  Philippa Cooper, daughter of Sir John Cooper, Bt of Winbourn St Giles, Dorset. His father was MP for Surrey.  He was educated at Trinity College, Oxford  and was commissioner for assessment for Surrey from 1673 to 1680.  
At a contested election in 1685, Browne was elected  Member of Parliament for Bletchingley. He became a gentleman of the privy chamber and captain in the Earl of Plymouth's horse at the time of Monmouth's rebellion. He opposed the king's religious policy and was cashiered in March 1687.

Browne died in 1688  and was buried at Dorking on 24 July. He predeceased his father and the baronetcy became extinct.

References

1659 births
1688 deaths
English MPs 1685–1687
Alumni of Trinity College, Oxford
People from Surrey (before 1889)
Gentlemen of the Privy Chamber
Heirs apparent who never acceded
Ambrose